The 1987 Kentucky Wildcats football team represented the University of Kentucky in the Southeastern Conference (SEC) during the 1987 NCAA Division I-A football season.  In their sixth season under head coach Jerry Claiborne, the Wildcats compiled a 5–6 record (1–5 against SEC opponents), finished in a tie for seventh place in the SEC, and outscored their opponents, 258 to 187.  The team played its home games in Commonwealth Stadium in Lexington, Kentucky.

The team's statistical leaders included Glenn Fohr with 973 passing yards, Mark Higgs with 1,278 rushing yards, and Dee Smith with 420 receiving yards.

Schedule

References

Kentucky
Kentucky Wildcats football seasons
Kentucky Wildcats football